Dalmiansyah Matutu (born 14 October  1996) is an Indonesian professional footballer who plays as a second striker for Liga 1 club Persikabo 1973.

Club career

Badak Lampung
In 2019, Dalmiansyah signed a contract with Indonesian Liga 1 club Badak Lampung. He made his league debut on 10 July 2019 in a match against Persipura Jayapura at the Mandala Stadium, Jayapura.

Sulut United
He was signed for Sulut United to play in Liga 2 in the 2021 season.

Return to Badak Lampung
In 2021, Dalmiansyah Matutu signed a contract with Indonesian Liga 2 club Badak Lampung. He made his league debut on 4 October against PSKC Cimahi at the Gelora Bung Karno Madya Stadium, Jakarta.

References

External links
 Dalmiansyah Matutu Soccerway
 Dalmiansyah Matutu Liga Indonesia

Indonesian footballers
Living people
1996 births
Liga 2 (Indonesia) players
Liga 1 (Indonesia) players
Arema F.C. players
Badak Lampung F.C. players
Persikabo 1973 players
Association football forwards
People from Bandar Lampung
Sportspeople from Lampung